The anchialine pool snail, scientific name Neritilia hawaiiensis, is a species living in  brackish estuaries and in anchialine pools. These snails have an operculum, and are aquatic gastropod mollusk in the family Neritiliidae.

Distribution
This species is endemic to the islands of Hawaii, United States, and lives only in brackish estuaries and in anchialine pools, which are marine pools that have no surface connection with the ocean but that are salty and that fluctuate in level with the tides.

References

Neritiliidae
Molluscs of Hawaii
Endemic fauna of Hawaii
Gastropods described in 1979
Taxonomy articles created by Polbot